Santiago Naveda Lara (born 16 April 2001) is a Mexican professional footballer who plays as a defensive midfielder for Ekstraklasa club Miedź Legnica, on loan from América.

Club career

América
Born in Mexico City, Naveda made his professional debut for Liga MX club América on 16 December 2020, in the CONCACAF Champions League against Atlanta United. He came on as a substitute.

Naveda scored his first professional goal against Querétaro on 13 February 2021, during a Liga MX match in the Guardianes 2021 season.

Miedź Legnica (loan)
On 9 August 2022, Naveda joined Polish Ekstraklasa club Miedź Legnica on a one-year loan spell. He made his debut with the club on 12 August 2022, against Zagłębie Lubin in a 1–0 loss. He scored his first goal for the club on 27 August 2022, scoring the second goal in the club's 2–1 win over Lechia Gdańsk.

International career
Naveda was called up by Raúl Chabrand to participate with the under-21 team at the 2022 Maurice Revello Tournament, where Mexico finished the tournament in third place.

Career statistics

Club

References

2001 births
Living people
Footballers from Mexico City
Association football midfielders
Mexican footballers
Mexico youth international footballers
Club América footballers
Miedź Legnica players
Liga MX players
Ekstraklasa players
III liga players
Mexican expatriate footballers
Expatriate footballers in Poland
Mexican expatriate sportspeople in Poland